Lim Eun-soo (Hangul: 임은수; born February 26, 2003) is a South Korean figure skater. She is the 2018 Rostelecom Cup bronze medalist, the two-time CS Asian Open champion (2018, 2019), the 2018 CS U.S. Classic silver medalist, and the 2017 South Korean national champion. She has finished within the top ten at three senior ISU Championships.

Earlier in her career, Lim won two medals on the ISU Junior Grand Prix series (bronze at the 2016 JGP Germany and silver at the 2017 JGP Austria). She has finished within the top five at the World Junior Championships for two consecutive years (2017, 2018).

She is currently the tenth highest ranked ladies' singles skater in the world by the International Skating Union following the 2020-21 figure skating season.

Career

Early years 
Lim was born on 26 February 2003 in Seoul, South Korea. Lim began skating in 2009. She started training with Chi Hyun-jung as her coach in 2014.

Nationally, Lim started competing at the senior level during the 2014–15 figure skating season. She obtained the bronze medal at the 2016 South Korean Championships, finishing behind You Young and Choi Da-bin.

2016–2017 season: Junior international debut and national title 

Lim debuted on the Junior Grand Prix (JGP) series in September 2016, placing fourth in Ljubljana, Slovenia. In October, she received the bronze medal at a JGP event in Dresden, Germany. In January 2017, she won her first senior national title. In March, Lim placed fourth overall at the 2017 World Junior Championships, scoring personal bests in every segment of the competition in her ISU championship debut.

2017–2018 season: Second JGP medal 
Lim started the season with a silver medal at the Asian Open Trophy in August. In September, she received the silver medal at JGP Salzburg, Austria, with a score of 186.34. She surpassed her old record, with a difference of almost six points. In her next JGP event, in Gdańsk, she received a score of 58.60 after struggling on the first spin of her program and an edge warning on her opening combination, a triple flip-triple toe loop. In the free skate, she received another unclear edge in her flip jump and popped a triple toe loop in her double axel, triple toe loop combination. Lim later suffered a fall on a triple Salchow, along with a jump repetition violation on her double axel, double toe loop combination near the end of her program, after doing it again halfway through her program. With a final score of 162.58, she placed fourth overall, losing her chance of making it to the Junior Grand Prix Final.

Lim announced at the beginning of December that she was diagnosed with a fracture on her right big toe.

In January, she placed third at the national championships. Lim was subsequently named as part of Korea's team to the 2018 World Junior Championships. She would place fifth in the short program and 6th in the free skate to finish fifth overall.

On April 18, it was reported that she would be moving to the United States to train with Rafael Arutyunyan at his California camp.

2018–2019 season: Senior international debut 
Lim started the 2018–2019 season with a win at the 2018 CS Asian Open Trophy, placing first in the short program and second in the free. She obtained a personal best in the short with a score of 68.09. Lim's second competition was the 2018 CS U.S. International Figure Skating Classic. At the event, she won a silver medal behind Satoko Miyahara of Japan and ahead of Kim Ye-lim, her Korean teammate.

About a month later, at the 2018 NHK Trophy, Lim earned a personal best of 69.78 in the short program, placing fourth. However, she struggled in the free program, receiving a score of 126.53. She finished the competition in sixth place with a score of 196.31.

At the 2018 Rostelecom Cup, Lim placed sixth in the short, missing her opening combination and stepping out on both her double axel and triple flip. However, she rebounded in the free program, skating cleanly and scoring a personal best in the free program, finishing third and winning her first senior medal on the Grand Prix circuit.  She commented:  "I have to skate better in my next competition, but overall I am satisfied. This season is really important for me because it is my first senior season."

After winning the silver medal at South Korea's national championships, finishing behind You Young, and was assigned to the Four Continents Championships, and as South Korea's lone ladies' entry to the 2019 World Championships.  At Four Continents, Lim placed fourth in the short program, with what would have been a new personal best score but for a one-point deduction for a time violation.  The free skate proved a disappointment by comparison, with several bad landings dropping her to eighth place overall.  Discussing her performance afterward, she said, "I felt like everything is not working today.  It’s just an experience. I don’t think today I had any part that’s good."

Lim went on to finish tenth at the 2019 World Championships, qualifying two spots for South Korea for the 2020 World Championships.  Lim's World Championship debut was overshadowed by controversy when accusations were made that Lim had been deliberately injured in practice by American skater Mariah Bell, who also trained with Rafael Arutyunyan. An investigation by the ISU subsequently found no evidence to support the allegation.

2019–2020 season 
Following the controversy at the World Championships, Lim departed Arutyunyan's camp and returned to Korea for training with her former coaches.  Lim began her season with her new coach at 2019 CS Autumn Classic International, where she ranked fifth in the short program and third in the free, winning the bronze medal.  She won a second bronze medal at the 2019 Shanghai Trophy.

Beginning the Grand Prix at 2019 Skate America, Lim was eighth in the short program following multiple jump errors.  She rose to fifth place overall in the free skate. Lim continued with struggles at the 2019 NHK Trophy, her second Grand Prix. In the short program, she had errors on her triple Lutz-triple toe loop combination, and in her free skate, she had multiple falls and numerous under rotations leading her to finish seventh overall.  She was seventh as well at the 2020 South Korean Championships, but as several of the skaters ahead of her were senior-ineligible, she was sent to the 2020 Four Continents Championships, held that year in Seoul.  She finished eighth at Four Continents, saying, " I couldn't be fully satisfied. So what I can do is practice hard and show good performances next year."

2020–2021 season 
With the COVID-19 pandemic greatly curtailing international opportunities for Korean skaters, Lim competed first at the 2021 South Korean Championships, placing sixth.

2021–2022 season 
Returning to international competition, Lim's first Grand Prix assignment was initially the 2021 Cup of China, but following that event's cancellation, she was reassigned to the 2021 Gran Premio d'Italia in Turin. She finished in sixth place at the event. The following week, she competed at her second event, 2021 NHK Trophy, where she was fifth in the short program. In the free skate, she aborted the takeoff on her planned triple flip and did not replace it, ending up with only six jumping passes instead of the allowed seven and ending up sixth in that segment, but remained in fifth overall.

Programs

Competitive highlights 
GP: Grand Prix; CS: Challenger Series; JGP: Junior Grand Prix

2016–17 to present

Pre-international debut

Detailed results

Senior level

Junior level 

 Personal best highlighted in bold.

Awards and recognition

References

Further reading
 2016 ISU JGP Germany Ladies Results
 2016 ISU JGP Slovenia Ladies Results
 2017 Asian Open Trophy Results
 2016 Asian Open Trophy Results
 2013 Asian Open Trophy Results

External links

 

! colspan="3" style="border-top: 5px solid #78FF78;" |World Record Holders

2003 births
Living people
South Korean female single skaters
Medalists at ISU championships
Female sports medalists
Figure skaters from Seoul